This article lists the winners and nominees for the NAACP Image Award for Outstanding Female Artist. Beyoncé currently holds the record for most wins in this category with seven.

Winners and nominees
Winners are listed first and highlighted in bold.

1980s

1990s

2000s

2010s

2020s

Multiple wins and nominations

Wins

 7 wins
 Beyoncé

 4 wins
 Alicia Keys
 Mary J. Blige

 3 wins
 Whitney Houston

Nominations

 14 nominations
 Mary J. Blige

 13 nominations
 Beyoncé

 9 nominations
 Alicia Keys

 7 nominations
 India.Arie

 6 nominations
 Jill Scott
 Janet Jackson

 5 nominations
 Whitney Houston
 Ledisi

 4 nominations
 Mariah Carey
 Fantasia
 Jazmine Sullivan

 3 nominations
 Erykah Badu
 Toni Braxton
 H.E.R.
 Jennifer Hudson
 Rihanna

 2 nominations
 Chlöe
 Corinne Bailey Rae
 Natalie Cole
 Andra Day
 Missy Elliott
 Aretha Franklin
 Lauryn Hill
 Ari Lennox
 Janelle Monáe
 SZA
 Vanessa Williams

References

NAACP Image Awards
Music awards honoring women